Julienne "Julie" Christensen is an American politician, who served on the San Francisco Board of Supervisors from January 2015 to December 2015, representing District 3.

Biography 

After studying sculpture, painting, and pre-law, Christensen worked for design firm Skidmore, Owings & Merrill in San Francisco before starting her own firm, Surface Work, in 1981. Among her designs is the color of the KitchenAid candy apple red mixer.

Political career 
In January 2015, Christensen was appointed by San Francisco Mayor Ed Lee to fill the District 3 supervisorial vacancy left by former Board of Supervisors President David Chiu upon his election to the California State Assembly.  In the closely fought supervisorial election in December 2015, she was defeated by Aaron Peskin, who had previously held the seat from 2001 until 2009. During the election campaign,  Julie Christensen cited the physics concept “wormhole”—a connection between two different space-times—to describe  the Stockton Street Tunnel  connecting Union Square and Chinatown, Peskin's ally Rose Pak distorted the word “wormhole” to imply that Chinatown is a hole of worms, which successfully triggered the anger of some Chinatown residents.  That negative press controlled by Rose Pak in Chinatown created an opportunity for Peskin to pick up much-needed votes in the Chinese community when he ran against Christensen.

She has also served on the Advisory Board for the San Francisco Planning and Urban Research Association and is an active proponent of extending San Francisco's Central Subway to North Beach.

Christensen currently serves as the executive director of the Dogpatch and Northwest Potrero Hill Green Benefit District.

References

External links
 Julie Christensen's official Board of Supervisors page

Living people
San Francisco Board of Supervisors members
Skidmore, Owings & Merrill people
Women city councillors in California
American industrial designers
Year of birth missing (living people)
21st-century American women